Alexanderfeld is a name of several localities,

 Alexanderfeld, a commune in Moldova
 Alexanderfeld, also Grishkovka, the selo in Altai Krai, Russia
 Alexanderfeld, the name of the settlement of Berezanka, Ukraine, in 1866-1914
 Alexanderfeld, the former name of the selo of Verkhovina, Ukraine